The Centre for the Public Awareness of Science is part of the Australian National University. In March 2000 it became an accredited Centre for the Australian National Commission for UNESCO.

Work of the Centre

As a UNESCO Centre, CPAS engages with science communication and communicators in the Pacific region and beyond.  In partnership with the UNESCO Pacific Office in Apia, Samoa, CPAS has focused on science teaching training and communication in Pacific nations.  As well as running a science journalism workshop for Pacific Island journalists in 2001, CPAS  followed up in the same year with a science teacher workshop and the first Pacific Science Communication Forum. The UNESCO office in Jakarta invited CPAS to join a mission to Cambodia to conduct a survey to identify and assess the needs of the country with respect to science education in schools and universities. Other activities include joining with UNESCO (Apia) to help in its aims to raise social participation in science in and around the Pacific.

CPAS also established, as a pilot project, the Register of Pacific Scientists, an online database for those involved with Pacific Science to record their details and/or search for other people with similar or complementary interests.

Other activities of CPAS include the presentation of workshops for secondary school science teachers and others in Fiji, India, Sri Lanka, Thailand, Japan and New Zealand. A joint teaching program is being developed with the National University of Singapore. In South Africa, CPAS helped to develop a touring hands-on science exhibition and has been invited to work in and with various South African science centres.

Teaching, Outreach and Research

With a flourishing graduate program, CPAS encourages research in all aspects of science communication. Degrees are offered at all tertiary levels. Outreach programs within Australia include workshops for research scientists, science teachers, science and engineering students and science centre personnel, as well as the ANU Shell Questacon Science Circus.

CPAS has a wide research program dealing with issues at the interface of science and the public. Apart from a long-standing agenda of research in science centres, CPAS is concerned with current issues in science, with the communication agendas of scientists, and with effective communication of science concepts. The research program is interdisciplinary and contributes to the emerging framework of science communication theory.

History

CPAS was launched by Professor Richard Dawkins in 1996. It owes it origin to the establishment, twenty years earlier, of a modest science centre in a vacant primary school in Canberra. This burgeoning science centre eventually grew into Questacon – The National Science and Technology Centre. Questacon was the brainchild of Michael Gore, a senior lecturer in Physics at the Australian National University, who became its first director. An important part of its activities was outreach, supported from the beginning by sponsorship from Shell Australia.

Dr Gore approached Professor Chris Bryant, then Dean of Science at the Australian National University, with a proposal to set up a science circus to travel Australia, to be staffed by graduate science students enrolled in a course of science communication. Thus was born the Graduate Certificate in Science Communication that rapidly metamorphosed into a Graduate Diploma. This initiative proved extremely popular and it became clear that there was a hitherto undetected demand for such a course. Over the next few years, Masters and PhD courses were offered and science communication became a full-fledged graduate program.

By 1994, the demand was so great that the Faculty of Science at the Australian National University agreed to fund a Lectureship in Science Communication. This was the first in Australia and, possibly, the world. Dr Susan Stocklmayer was appointed to the position and immediately announced her intention of establishing a university centre for science communication.  The centre was established in 1996, with Professor Bryant as its first, interim, director. Dr Stocklmayer took over the position in 1998, where she remains today.

Awards

In subsequent years, the work of CPAS has been recognised by a number of awards and honours: In 1999, CPAS, Shell Australia and Questacon jointly won the Business/Higher Education Round Table Award. The citation commends CPAS as “a university centre whose brief is to empower Australians by encouraging in them the confidence of 'ownership' of modern science. It is intended to increase science awareness in the Australian community and to improve communication skills of scientists.”  In 2000, its standing was such that it was designated as the first UNESCO Centre for Science Communication.

In 2004, the triple partnership was awarded the Financial Review National Award for long term sponsorship, and in 2006 it won the Special Award for Excellence in the Prime Ministers Community Business Partnerships. The individual contributions of members of CPAS have also been widely recognised and they have received many personal accolades.

References

External links
 Training Course in Science Journalism

Australian National University
Science in society
Scientific organisations based in Australia